Clathurella perdecorata is a species of sea snail, a marine gastropod mollusk in the family Clathurellidae.

Description
The shell grows to a length of 11 mm.

Distribution
This species occurs in the Atlantic Ocean along Georgia, USA

References

perdecorata